Amir Machmud (21 February 1923 – 21 April 1995) was an Indonesian military general who was an eyewitness to the signing of the Supersemar document transferring power from President Sukarno to General Suharto.

Early life
Amir Machmud was born on 21 February 1923 in Cimahi, West Java. He was the second of five siblings and his father worked for a public company under the Dutch Colonial Government. He was educated at the "Ardjoena" Hollandsch-Inlandsche School in Bandung, graduating in 1938. He continued his education at a technical school for a further two years, then in 1941 he took a topography course.

Military career

The Japanese Occupation
In 1942, the Dutch Colonial Government was defeated by the Japanese Imperial Army and Indonesia came under the occupation of the Japanese Empire. By 1943, with the tide of the war beginning to turn against them, the Japanese established Defenders of the Homeland (PETA), an auxiliary force made up of Indonesians designed to bolster the number of troops for the Japanese and assist them in fighting a possible Allied invasion of Java. Amir Machmud joined PETA in 1943 remained a member until 1945.

Military career in the Sukarno era
On 17 August 1945, nationalist leaders Sukarno and Mohammad Hatta proclaimed Indonesia's Independence. Days later, the Preparatory Committee for Indonesian Independence (PPKI) announced the establishment of the People's Security Body (BKR).  were formed and Amir Machmud headed a unit in Lembang, West Java.

In 1946, after the People's Security Army (TKR) had been established, the Lembang BKR was integrated into the Siliwangi Division, a military regional command responsible for the security of West Java. Amir Machmud was then transferred to North Bandung, where he led his troops in battles against British troops and Dutch troops, who were eager to retain their colonial empire.

The Siliwangi Division was then forced to leave West Java in 1948 after the signing of the Renville Agreement. Under this agreement, the Indonesian government was forced to recognize territories which had been taken under Dutch Control and this included West Java. Under the command of Colonel Abdul Haris Nasution, the division was relocated to Central Java. During the same year, Amir Machmud would join his troops in a crackdown on the Communist Party of Indonesia (PKI) at Madiun.

In 1949, with the Dutch beginning to withdraw from Indonesia, Amir Machmud and his troops returned to West Java. There, he would be involved in skirmishes against the Darul Islam movement, a rebel group who wanted to establish a theocratic Indonesia under the religion of Islam. In 1950, Amir Machmud was also involved in a crackdown against the "Just King" Legion (APRA), a military group which entered Bandung and started targeting TNI soldiers.

After the end of the war of independence, the military was reorganized into seven "Territories and Armies" (Teritorium dan Tentara). Amir Machmud remained with the Siliwangi T&T until 1960, ending his time in command of troops in Bandung. He studied at the Army Staff College (Seskoad) Here, he learned about politics and economics, important subjects for a soldier in an army increasingly involved in the running of the Government. He also became acquainted with Suharto during his time at Seskoad.

Once he had completed his Seskoad course, Amir Machmud was appointed Caduad Deputy Chief of Staff of the Army General reserve (Caduad), who would go on to become Kostrad, which was a strategic force which was designed to be on stand by at all times so that it could easily be summoned during any national emergency. Caduad was commanded by Suharto.

In 1962, President Sukarno was determined that Indonesia would occupy Western New Guinea and formed a war command for the liberation of Western New Guinea. For this operation, Suharto was appointed Field Commander and once again, he showed his trust in Amir Machmud by appointing him to the position of Head of the Operational Staff. However, after some minor military incursions, the Netherlands yielded under pressure of the United States and signed the New York Agreement to transfer Western New Guinea to Indonesia, provided a plebiscite would be held in which Western New Guinea could vote for independence.

Amir Machmud would now have his first stint as a Regional Commander. On 5 September 1962, he was appointed Commander of KODAM X/Lambung Mangkurat, which was responsible for the security of South Kalimantan. He held the post until 1965.

On 1 October 1965 the 30 September Movement made a coup attempt in Jakarta . The movement announced the formation of a Revolutionary Council which included Amir Machmud as a member. Like many other anti-Communist Generals who were on the list, he was quick to deny membership. The day would finish with Suharto taking back control of the situation in Jakarta and the PKI being accused of being behind the coup attempt.

The transition to New Order
In December 1965, Amir Machmud was appointed Commander of KODAM V/Jaya and he was now responsible for the security of Jakarta and its surrounding areas.

Amir Machmud's appointment came at a crucial point in Indonesian history and it was during his appointment that Suharto was beginning to gather political support and momentum to mount a challenge to Sukarno. Amir Machmud, like most of his Army colleagues threw their support behind Suharto.

At the beginning of 1966, Sukarno's popularity declined enough for people to openly oppose him via the means of protests. The most vocal of the protesters was the Indonesian Students Action Front (KAMI) which on 10 January demanded that the PKI be banned, PKI sympathizers be arrested and for prices to be lowered. Amir Machmud and the Army supported, encouraged, and protected the protesters. To make things more practical, Amir Machmud together with Umar Wirahadikusumah (the Kostrad Commander) and Sarwo Edhie Wibowo (the RPKAD Commander) authorized Kostrad Chief of Staff, Kemal Idris to take control of their troops which were now concentrated in Jakarta.

There was duality to Amir Machmud's stance at this point. Politically, he was with Suharto, the Army, and the anti-Sukarno protesters. At the same time however, he felt a professional responsibility to prevent Jakarta being reduced to chaos by all the protests and demonstrations. In February, Amir Machmud actually banned protests in Jakarta. This ban was ignored.

On 11 March 1966, Sukarno held a cabinet meeting and invited Amir Machmud to attend. Before the meeting Sukarno asked Amir Machmud if the situation was secure to which Amir Machmud responded that it was. Sukarno then began the meeting which was marked conspicuously by Suharto's absence. Ten minutes into the meeting, Amir Machmud was approached by Brigadier General Sabur, the Commander of the Presidential Bodyguards. Sabur said that there were unidentified troops outside the palace. Amir Machmud told Sabur to not worry about it.

Five minutes later, Sabur repeated the message, this time notifying Sukarno of the problem as well. Sukarno quickly suspended the meeting and left the room with Amir Machmud. Insisting that Sukarno would be safe, Amir Machmud discussed security options with the President and decided that Bogor would be a safe enough place to avoid the tense situation.

The meeting was adjourned after Sukarno left for Bogor with a helicopter and Amir Machmud was joined by Major General Basuki Rachmat, who was the Minister of Veterans' Affairs and Brigadier General Mohammad Jusuf, who was the Minister of Industry. Jusuf suggested that the three of them go to Bogor to provide from moral support for Sukarno. The other two generals agreed and together, the three left to Bogor after asking for Suharto's permission. According to Amir Machmud, Suharto asked the three generals to tell Sukarno of his readiness to restore security should the President order it.

At Bogor, the three met with Sukarno and once again Amir Machmud said to Sukarno that the situation was secure. Sukarno became angry with him, asking how the situation could be secure when the protests were happening. Sukarno then began discussing options with Basuki, Jusuf, and Amir Machmud before finally asking them how he could take care of the situation. Amir Machmud suggested that Sukarno give Suharto some powers and govern Indonesia with him so that everything can be secured. The meeting then disbanded as Sukarno began preparing a Presidential Decree.

It was dusk when the decree that would become the Supersemar was finally prepared and awaiting Sukarno's signature. Sukarno had some last-minute doubts but Amir Machmud, the other two generals, and members of Sukarno's inner circle in the cabinet who had also made the trip to Bogor encouraged him to sign. Sukarno finally signed and handed the Supersemar to Basuki to be passed on to Suharto. On the way back to Jakarta, Amir Machmud asked to read the document and seemed shocked to find out that it was a handover of power to Suharto. He would later claim that the Supersemar was a miracle.

On 13 March, Sukarno summoned Amir Machmud, Basuki, and Jusuf. Sukarno was angry that Suharto had banned the Communist Party of Indonesia (PKI) and told the three generals that Supersemar did not contain such instructions. Sukarno then ordered that a letter be produced to clarify the contents of Supersemar but nothing ever came up apart from the copies that former Ambassador to Cuba, AM Hanafi recollected.

Political career

Minister of Home Affairs
As Suharto removed Sukarno from power and replaced him as president in 1967, Amir Machmud continued as Commander of Kodam V/Jaya. In early 1969, Basuki, who became the Minister of Home Affairs died suddenly. Amir Machmud was then transferred from his position as Commander to Kodam V/Jaya to take Basuki's place as Minister of Home Affairs, a position he held until his resignation in October 1982.

During his tenure as Minister of Home Affairs, Amir Machmud developed a reputation of being tough on government opponents and dissidents. This earned him the nickname of "The Bulldozer. He also dealt harshly with the people who had gone to prison for allegedly being involved with the PKI. In 1981, he ordered that the former convicts be given special supervision.

Amir Machmud also helped strengthen Suharto's control over Indonesia. In 1969, he banned civil servants from being involved in politics but would encourage them to vote to Golkar in Legislative Elections as a sign of loyalty to the government. In 1971, Amirmachmud was influential in the formation of the Indonesian Civil Servants' Corps (KORPRI).

Chairman of the General Elections Organization (LPU)
In addition to being Minister of Home Affairs, Amir Machmud was also the Chairman of the General Elections Institute (LPU). The Legislative elections of 1971, 1977, and 1982 were held under his supervision.

Chairman of the MPR and DPR
In October 1982, Amir Machmud was elected as the chairman of the People's Consultative Assembly (MPR) and speaker of the  concurrently speaker of the People's Representative Council (DPR).

Amir Machmud presided over the 1983 MPR General Session which saw Suharto being elected to a 4th term as President with Umar Wirahadikusumah being elected to the Vice Presidency. Under his chairmanship, the MPR also awarded Suharto the title of "The Father of Development" in recognition of what he had achieved.

In the DPR, Amir Machmud presided over the passing of laws which reorganized the structure of the MPR, DPR, and Regional People's Representative Council (DPRD), set the rules for Political Parties, and laid down the guidelines for a referendum.

Retired Life and Death
Amir Machmud served as the Chairman of MPR/Head of DPR until 1987. This was to be his last post before retirement. He died on 21 April 1995 leaving a wife, two children and ten grandchildren.

Miscellaneous
Amir Machmud became close friends with fellow Supersemar witness, M Jusuf. Before he died, Amir Machmud had requested that Jusuf attend his funeral. This request was never fulfilled as Jusuf was unable to attend the funeral. Amir Machmud also left Jusuf a secret letter.

Quotes
"Supersemar itu benar-benar mukjizat Allah" ("Supersemar was truly the miracle of God")

Works
Developing Politics at Home (1981)
Developing A Religious Life In A Pancasila World (1981)
Developing A Pancasila Social Culture (1983)

Notes

References

External links
 Article on Amirmachmud's Death
 Amirmachmud Profile on pdat.co.id

1923 births
Sundanese people
1995 deaths
Indonesian collaborators with Imperial Japan
Indonesian generals
Indonesian Muslims
Interior ministers of Indonesia
Members of Pembela Tanah Air
People from Cimahi
Speakers of the People's Consultative Assembly